Flight 5 or Flight 005 may refer to the following accidents involving commercial airliners:
Northwest Airlines Flight 5 (1941) from Minneapolis to Fargo, which experienced severe icing and crashed on 30 October 1941
Lufthansa Flight 005 from Frankfurt to Bremen, which crashed on 28 January 1966, killing all 46 people on board
Northwest Airlines Flight 5 (1990) from Miami to Minneapolis, which lost an engine on 4 January 1990

0005